Craving is Japanese singer songwriter Fayray's first studio album, released on May 26, 1999. The album was produced by Daisuke Asakura.

Track listing

Charts and sales

References

External links

1999 debut albums
Fayray albums